Zarhipis is a genus of glowworm beetles in the family Phengodidae. There are at least three described species in Zarhipis, all restricted to the western regions of North America.

Species
These three species belong to the genus Zarhipis:
 Zarhipis integripennis (LeConte, 1874) i c g b (western banded glowworm)
 Zarhipis tiemanni Linsdale, 1964 i c g
 Zarhipis truncaticeps Fall, 1923 i c g
Data sources: i = ITIS, c = Catalogue of Life, g = GBIF, b = Bugguide.net

References

Further reading

External links

 

Phengodidae
Bioluminescent insects
Articles created by Qbugbot